Eva-Maria ten Elsen (later Hartmann, born 14 September 1937) is a German former swimmer who won a bronze medal in the 200 m breaststroke event at the 1956 Summer Olympics.

She failed to qualify for the 1960 Olympics, and in 1961 retired from swimming. After graduating in 1966 from the German University of Physical Education (DHfK) in Leipzig she worked for several years as a swimming coach. From 1971 to 1990 she was employed by the sporting goods company Expovita. After the German Unification she worked in the real estate and public health insurance areas.

References

1937 births
Living people
German female swimmers
German female breaststroke swimmers
Olympic swimmers of the United Team of Germany
Swimmers at the 1956 Summer Olympics
Olympic bronze medalists for the United Team of Germany
Olympic bronze medalists in swimming
Medalists at the 1956 Summer Olympics
People from Altenburg
Sportspeople from Thuringia